Philadelpho Menezes (1960 in São Paulo, Brazil – 2000 following a car accident). Brazilian poet, visual poet, pioneer of new media poetry, professor in the Communication and Semiotics post-graduation program at the Pontifical University of São Paulo. He performed research for his post-graduate degree at the University of Bologna, in Italy (1990). With Brazilian artist Wilton Azevedo Philadepho Menezes created a pioneer intermedia-poetry CD-ROM: "InterPoesia. Poesia Hipermidia Interativa" (1998). In Italy he collaborated with the first net-poetry project: Karenina.it, by Italian artist Caterina Davinio.

Publications
His doctorate thesis was published under the title "The Crises of the Past: Modernity, Post-Modernity, Meta-Modernity." He published his first book of poems, "4 achados construídos" (four found and built) in 1980.
Other publications are:
Poemas 1980-1982 ("Poems 1980-1982") (1984)
Demolições (ou poemas aritméticos) [Demolitions (or arithmetic poems)], 1988
Poetry and Visualization: Contemporary Brazilian Poetry, book essay, 1991
Poesia Sonora – Poéticas experimentais da voz no Século XX. São Paulo, EDUC, 1992
Poetics and new technologies of communication: a semiotic approach" in Face. Revista de Semiótica e Comunicação, D.1, 1998
Poesia Intersignos-Do Impresso ao Sonoro e ao Digital. In: Exposição, Poesia Sonora, Seminário. São Paulo, Paço das Artes da Universidade de São Paulo, 1998
Poesia intersignos, Timbre, São Paulo, Brasil, 1985

CD Rom
Poesia sonora (do fonetismo às poéticas contempoâneas da voz), LLS, Univ. Catolica de São Paulo, Brasil, 1996
Interpoesia (Poesia Hipermidia Interativa), PUC-SP y Univ. Presbiteriana Mackenzie, 1997–98

Cultural Festivals
He organized important cultural festivals about international experimental poetry, new media poetry, avant-gardes, such as:
"Sonorous Poetry: Experimental Poetry of the Voice of the 20th Century" (1992)
"Inter-Sign Poetry" (1985)
the "International Show of Visual Poetry of São Paulo" (1988)

References
 Philadelpho Menezes, Poesia Sonora – Poéticas experimentais da voz no Século XX. São Paulo, EDUC, 1992
 Philadelpho Menezes, "Poetics and new technologies of communication: a semiotic approach" in "Face. Revista de Semiótica e Comunicação", D.1, 1998, site: [www.pucsp br/~cos-puc/face]
 Philadelpho Menezes, "Poesia Intersignos-Do Impresso ao Sonoro e ao Digital". In: "Exposição, Poesia Sonora", Seminário. São Paulo, Paço das Artes da Universidade de São Paulo, 1998
 Philadelpho Menezes - Poesia Intersignos, Timbre, São Paulo, Brasil, 1985
 Caterina Davinio, Tecno-Poesia e realtà virtuali (Techno-Poetry and Virtual Realities), Mantova (I), Sometti Publ., 2002
 "Guia para la lectura de la poesia intersignos", en compilación de César Espinosa Signos Corrosivos, Ed. Factor, Ciudad de México, México,1987
 "Uma abordagem tipologica da poesia visual", en catálogo I Mostra Internacional de Poesía Visual de São Paulo, Nobel, São Paulo, Brasil, 1988
 Poetica e visualidad (uma trajetória da poesía brasileña contemporánea), Editora da UNICAMP, Campinas, Brasil, 1991
 Poetics and Visuality, San Diego State University Press, San Diego, California, USA, 1994, Trad. Harry Polkinhorn
 "Brazilian Visual Poetry", en revista "Visible Language", vol. 27, nr. 4, Rhode Island School of Language, Providence, USA, 1993
 "El experimentalismo poetico moderno (Poesía visual: en busca del arte actual)", capítulo V del libro A crise do passado. Modernidad, vanguarda, metamodernidad, Ed. Experimento, São Paulo, Brasil, 1994
 Roteiro de leitura: poesia concreta e visual, Editora Atica, São Paulo, Brasil, 1998
 "Poesia intersignos (Do impresso ao sonoro e ao digital)", en catálogo homónimo, Paço das Artes, São Paulo, Brasil, 1998

CD Rom
 Philadelpho Menezes, Poesia sonora (do fonetismo às poéticas contempoâneas da voz), LLS, Univ. Catolica de São Paulo, Brasil,1996.
 Philadelpho Menezes y Wilton Azeredo, INTERPOESIA (Poesia Hipermidia Interativa), PUC-SP y Univ. Presbiteriana Mackenzie, 1997–98.

External links
 Review
 
 Karenina.it  it, en
 Poevisioni 2000 it
 Art Tribus

See also

 Digital poetry
 Visual poetry
 Concrete Poetry

1960 births
2000 deaths
Writers from São Paulo
Brazilian male poets
20th-century Brazilian poets
20th-century Brazilian male writers
Visual poets